Havelaue is a municipality in the Havelland district, in Brandenburg, Germany.

Demography

Notable people from Havelaue
 Hans Tappenbeck (18611889), military officer

See also
Gülper See

References

Localities in Havelland